The Merrimack Premium Outlets is an outlet mall located in Merrimack, New Hampshire, United States. It opened on June 14, 2012, and contains 103 stores and restaurants.

The mall includes several upscale outlets, such as Barbour, Coach, Michael Kors, Guess, True Religion, and Lucky Brand Jeans. Larger anchor-type stores in the complex include Polo Ralph Lauren, Saks Fifth Avenue Off 5th, Bloomingdales Outlet, and a Banana Republic factory store.

The complex is located off Exit 10 of the F.E. Everett Turnpike in Merrimack, and is not far from U.S. Route 3, the major north/south surface road in town.

Stores and restaurants
Merrimack Premium Outlets has 10 restaurants and 93 stores.

The restaurants are:

 Auntie Anne's
 Bananas
 Beef Jerky Outlet
 Buckhead Grill
 Chicken Now
 China Max
 Dairy Queen
 Green Leaf's and Bananas
 Lindt Chocolate
 Villa Fresh Italian Kitchen

References

External links
Official website
Article on the mall's building process

Simon Property Group
Shopping malls in New Hampshire
Outlet malls in the United States
Companies based in Merrimack, New Hampshire
Premium Outlets
Shopping malls established in 2012
2012 establishments in New Hampshire